TxK is an action video game developed by Llamasoft and designed by Jeff Minter. The game was released on the PlayStation Vita on February 11, 2014. The game was planned for release on PC, PlayStation 4, and Android platforms until Atari made legal threats against Llamasoft, citing similarities between TxK and Tempest 2000.

It is a tube shooter based on the classic arcade game Tempest.  The gameplay expands upon that of the original by including power-ups which grant the player additional abilities.  The option is available to play without power-ups, however.

Reception
The game received positive reviews upon release, garnering a score of 84 out of 100 on the review aggregation website Metacritic.

IGN found the updated art style "overwhelming at times" but appreciated the "winning soundtrack and forgiving save system".  They said "In the end, I simply couldn't put it down."  The game was also praised by Edge magazine who noted the "wonderfully crisp" presentation and declared it to be "twitch gaming at its finest." They concluded by stating "Dynamic, thrilling and wholly invigorating, TxK isn't just one of the best games on Vita: it might just be the best Minter's ever made, too."

Legal troubles
On March 18, 2015, Minter made public that the current holders of the Atari name and trademark have made legal threats and issued cease and desist orders over the game blocking release to PC, PlayStation 4, and Android platforms.

After the success of Llamasoft's Polybius, Atari came to a deal with Llamasoft and TxK was reworked into Tempest 4000 and released with Atari's approval.

References

2014 video games
Shooter video games
PlayStation Vita games
PlayStation Vita-only games
PlayStation Network games
Llamasoft games
Video games developed in the United Kingdom